Scalidion is a genus of beetles in the family Carabidae, containing the following species:

 Scalidion hilare Schmidt-Gobel, 1846
 Scalidion xanthophanum (Bates, 1888)

References

Lebiinae